Kärla Parish was a municipality in Saare County, Estonia.
In 2014, it was merged with the municipalities of Kaarma and Lümanda to become the Lääne-Saare municipality.

The parish consisted of one small town, Kärla,  and 22 villages: Anepesa, Arandi, Hirmuste, Jõempa, Käesla, Kandla, Karida, Kirikuküla, Kogula, Kulli, Kuuse, Kõrkküla, Mätasselja, Mõnnuste, Nõmpa, Paevere, Paiküla, Sauvere, Sõmera, Ulje, Vendise and Vennati. The municipality had a population of 1,803 (as of 1 January 2007) and covered an area of 217.87 km² (84.12 mi²).

References

External links 
  

Former municipalities of Estonia